"Am I the Same Girl?" is a popular song written by Eugene Record and Sonny Sanders. First recorded in 1968 by Barbara Acklin, "Am I the Same Girl?" charted most successfully in the US as a 1992 release by Swing Out Sister. However, the song had its greatest impact as a 1968–69 instrumental hit single by Young-Holt Unlimited under the title "Soulful Strut".

Background
Although Barbara Acklin recorded the song first, producer Carl Davis removed her voice from the track, replaced it with a piano solo by Floyd Morris, and released the resultant track in November 1968 as "Soulful Strut" credited to Young-Holt Unlimited; it became a No. 3 hit in the United States and went to No. 1 in Canada. It became a gold record. Neither Eldee Young nor Red Holt is believed to have played on the track, which was the work of session musicians identified only as the Brunswick Studio Band. Acklin's version was released in February 1969 and reached #33 on the R&B chart, crossing over and peaking at #79 on the pop listing.

Charts

Dusty Springfield version

Dusty Springfield, on the recommendation of Douggie Reece, the bassist in her touring band the Echoes, recorded "Am I the Same Girl?" at Philips Studios Marble Arch in August 1969; Bill Landis produced the session, which was arranged by Keith Mansfield. The track marked Springfield's last UK chart appearance of the 1960s, though it was not a major hit, stalling at No. 43. "Am I the Same Girl?" also gave Springfield a minor hit in Australia (#75).

Swing Out Sister version

The vocal version "Am I the Same Girl?" had its most successful incarnation via a 1992 remake by Swing Out Sister, recorded for the album Get in Touch with Yourself. The group's vocalist Corinne Drewery has acknowledged Dusty Springfield as a major influence; however, it was a chance hearing of the original Barbara Acklin version at a Manchester disco specializing in Northern soul that convinced Drewery and her Swing Out Sister partner Andy Connell to remake "Am I the Same Girl?".

Released as the lead single from the album, "Am I the Same Girl?" gave Swing Out Sister their highest UK chart ranking since their inaugural chart singles in 1986–87, the Top Ten hits "Breakout" and "Surrender"; peaking at number 21. The track had more impact in continental Europe, peaking at number eight in Germany, and number 15 in the Netherlands. "Am I the Same Girl?" also represented a strong comeback for Swing Out Sister in the US, where it was released in September 1992 and reached number 45 on the Billboard Hot 100 — the track's peak on the Cashbox Pop 100 was number 32 — while reaching number one on the Adult Contemporary chart.

Having recorded two distinct live renditions of "Am I the Same Girl?" which appear on, respectively, Live at the Jazz Café (1993) and Live in Tokyo (2005), Swing Out Sister recorded a new studio version of the song for their 2012 album Private View.

Other versions

In 1969, Bill Deal and the Rhondels included a version of "Soulful Strut" on their Vintage Rock LP (on Heritage Records, HTS-35,003).

Brazilian organist Walter Wanderley recorded a Bossa Nova driven cover of Soulful Strut on his 1969 album, Moondreams.

German pianist Horst Jankowski recorded Soulful Strut as the opening track of his 1969 album, A Walk in the Evergreens.

In 1970, Salena Jones recorded "Am I the Same Girl?" for her album Everybody's Talkin' About Salena Jones.

In 1979 George Benson recorded a cover of "Soulful Strut" on his album Livin' Inside Your Love.

In 1996 Grover Washington Jr. covered the song for his album of the same name. It was also later released as a remix under the title The Top Down version. 

In 1996 Paul Jackson, Jr. recorded a cover of "Soulful Strut" on his album Never Alone: Duets.

In 1999, saxophonist Kim Waters recorded "Am I the Same Girl (Soulful Strut)" for his One Special Moment album; featuring vocalist Meli'sa Morgan and Chuck Loeb, the track was a non-charting single release in February 2000.

In 2005, Joss Stone used the Young-Holt version as a starting point for her song "Don't Cha Wanna Ride", and credited the composers of "Am I the Same Girl?" as co-composers of her song.

Additionally, in September 2005, Martha Stewart began to use the Swing Out Sister version in her promo commercials for her show Martha on NBC television in America and then as the opening introduction theme song of the show. Each show starts with the song playing over a montage of images and photos of Martha Stewart growing up.

Dionne Bromfield covered the song on her debut album Introducing Dionne Bromfield (2009).

References

1968 singles
1969 singles
1992 singles
Dusty Springfield songs
Swing Out Sister songs
Songs written by Eugene Record
Brunswick Records singles
Fontana Records singles
Philips Records singles
1968 songs
Songs written by Sonny Sanders
Barbara Acklin songs